is a Japanese diver. She has represented Japan at various international events since the age of 14, including the 2015 World Aquatics Championships and the 2016 Summer Olympics.

Early life
Itahashi was born in Takarazuka, Hyōgo Prefecture. She commenced swimming at the JSS swimming school in Takarazuka when in her first grade of elementary school. When in the third grade she switched to diving after first participating in a one-month course. Her father is a former judo player.

Diving career
In 2013, when a second grade student at Gotenyama Junior High School, Itahashi finished third in the 10m platform event of the national championships. Her performance earned her selection to compete at the 2013 East Asian Games, her first international event. At the Games she finished 5th in the 1m springboard event and 7th in the 3m springboard event.

In June 2014 Itahashi won the 10m platform event at the national indoor invitational championships, followed by wins in the platform and springboard events at the national junior high school championships in August. In September 2014, Itahashi won the 3m springboard event at the Japanese national championships and earned selection for the 2014 Asian Games. Her victory at the national championships at the age of 14 years and 8 months made her the youngest person to win a springboard diving event in the 90-year history of the championships. At the Asian Games in October 2014, Itahashi finished in 5th in the platform event and 7th in the 3m springboard event.

In July 2015 Itahashi competed in the 3m springboard event at the World Aquatics Championships held in Russia. In the preliminary round she successfully completed a 109C dive (a forward dive with 4 1/2 turns in the tuck position), the first woman to do so at an international competition. She advanced to the semi-finals in 6th position, but an error in a subsequent dive saw her fall to 16th place and miss out on a berth in the final.

In February 2016 Itahashi secured a berth at the Rio Olympics by qualifying for the final of the 10m platform event at the 2016 FINA Diving World Cup. She failed to qualify in the 3m springboard event however, finishing 22nd in the qualifying round. At the 2016 Olympic Games she finished eighth in the 10m platform diving. In November 2016, Itahashi claimed a silver medal in the 3m springboard event at a grand prix event in Singapore, followed by a bronze medal in the 10m platform event at the 2016 Asian Swimming Championships.

See also
 Japan at the 2015 World Aquatics Championships
 Japan at the 2016 Summer Olympics

References

Living people
2000 births
Japanese female divers
People from Takarazuka, Hyōgo
Sportspeople from Hyōgo Prefecture
Divers at the 2014 Asian Games
Divers at the 2018 Asian Games
Divers at the 2016 Summer Olympics
Olympic divers of Japan
Asian Games competitors for Japan
Divers at the 2020 Summer Olympics
21st-century Japanese women